The 2019 Sud Ladies Cup was an international association football tournament held in Provence-Alpes-Côte d'Azur, France. The six national teams involved in the tournament were required to register a squad of 22 players; only players in these squads were eligible to take part in the tournament.

France 
Head coach:  Gilles Eyquem

Gabon 
Head coach:  Jeanne Moussavou

Haiti 
Head coach:  Gerardo Contreras

Japan 
Head coach:  Futoshi Ikeda

Mexico 
Head coach:  Mónica Vergara

North Korea 
Head coach:  Song Sung-gwon

References

Sud Ladies Cup squads
Sud Ladies Cup